Lee Jong-chan (born December 10, 1984) is a former wushu taolu athlete from South Korea. He is a one-time world champion and a silver medalist at the 2010 Asian Games. He also competed in the 2008 Beijing Wushu Tournament and finished sixth in men's daoshu and gunshu.

See also 

 List of Asian Games medalists in wushu

References

External links 

 Athlete profile at the 2008 Beijing Wushu Tournament

1984 births
Living people
South Korean wushu practitioners
Competitors at the 2008 Beijing Wushu Tournament
Wushu practitioners at the 2010 Asian Games
Asian Games silver medalists for South Korea
Asian Games medalists in wushu
Medalists at the 2010 Asian Games